Saycon Sengbloh (born October 23, 1977) is an American actress and singer. She was nominated for a Tony Award for Best Featured Actress in a Play and won a Drama Desk Award for Outstanding Featured Actress in a Play and an Obie Award for Outstanding Performance for her role in Danai Gurira's play Eclipsed in 2016.

Life and career
Sengbloh was born in Atlanta, Georgia. She first began acting at Tri-Cities School for the Visual and Performing Arts. Sengbloh then attended Agnes Scott College in Decatur, Georgia, where she studied music and Spanish before leaving to pursue a career in acting and music.

Stage
Sengbloh has starred in a number of Broadway musicals, including Aida, Wicked (as a standby for Elphaba), The Color Purple, Hair, Fela!, Motown: The Musical, and Holler If Ya Hear Me. Her breakthrough came in 2015, when Danai Gurira cast Sengbloh in Eclipsed, a play about five Liberian women and their tale of survival near the end of the Second Liberian Civil War. It became the first play with an all-black and female creative cast and team to premiere on Broadway. Eclipsed opened Off-Broadway at The Public Theater in October 2015 with positive reviews and ran until November 2015. The following year, it transferred to Broadway, premiering at the John Golden Theatre with an opening on March 6, 2016. Her performance received positive reviews from critics. She won Drama Desk Award for Outstanding Featured Actress in a Play for original Off-Broadway production, and Tony Award for Best Featured Actress in a Play nomination for Broadway production.

Television and film
Sengbloh made her screen debut playing opposite Kimberly Elise in the 1997 television film The Ditchdigger's Daughters. In 1999, she made her big screen debut appearing in the independent drama film Funny Valentines starring Alfre Woodard. She later played small parts in films Across the Universe and American Gangster. She also made guest appearances on television series including Law & Order and The Good Wife.

In 2017, Sengbloh was cast in a recurring role as Angela Webster for the sixth season of Shonda Rhimes' political drama Scandal. She played the role of Roberta in the 2018 historical drama film Ask for Jane. In 2021, she starred opposite Jennifer Hudson in the biographical drama film Respect playing Erma Franklin, the elder sister of Aretha Franklin. In 2021, it was announced that she would play the mother in the reboot of the TV series, "The Wonder Years."

Filmography

Film

Television

Awards and nominations

References

External links

1977 births
20th-century American actresses
21st-century American actresses
African-American actresses
Actresses from Atlanta
American people of Liberian descent
American television actresses
American stage actresses
Living people
Drama Desk Award winners
20th-century African-American women
20th-century African-American people
21st-century African-American women
21st-century African-American people